Pottinger County is one of the 141 Cadastral divisions of New South Wales. It is located to the south west of the Namoi River and Mooki River, near Gunnedah.

Pottinger County was named in honour of the first Governor of Hong Kong Sir Henry Pottinger, first Baronet (1789-1856).

Parishes 
A full list of parishes found within this county; their current local government areas of Australia (LGA) and mapping coordinates to the approximate centre of each location is as follows:

References

Counties of New South Wales